The Indian cricket team are two times World Champions. In addition to winning the 1983 Cricket World Cup, India was also first country to win Cricket World Cup on home soil in 2011. They were also runners-up at the 2003 Cricket World Cup, and semifinalists four times (1987, 1996, 2015, 2019). India's historical win–loss record at the cricket world cup is 53-29, with 1 match being tied and another one being abandoned due to rain.

Overall record

By opponent

India at the 1975 World Cup

 NR means No result.

The 1975 Cricket World Cup was the first Cricket World Cup. It was held in England in June 1975 and consisted of two weeks of one-day matches played 60-overs-a-side. The format consisted of a group stage, in which each team played the other three teams in its group of four. The top two teams from both groups would progress to the semifinals. India competed in Group B against England, New Zealand and East Africa, a team of cricketers from Kenya, Uganda, Tanzania, and Northern Rhodesia.

The Indian team was led by off spinner Srinivasaraghavan Venkataraghavan and included leading batsmen Sunil Gavaskar, Gundappa Vishwanath, and Farokh Engineer as well as Venkataraghavan's teammate from the Indian spin quartet, Bishen Singh Bedi. The team was relatively inexperienced at one-day cricket, having played their first ODI only a year earlier during their disastrous tour of England. India's first match, the first match of the Cup, was against England at Lord's in London. This match became notorious for Gavaskar's controversial knock. Chasing a mammoth 335 for victory, Gavaskar carried his bat for the entire 60 overs to score only 36 runs off 174 balls with just a solitary boundary. As a result, India could only score 132/3 in 60 overs, losing the match by 202 runs, which severely affected their chances of making the semifinals. The match was a national disgrace for India with Gavaskar, in particular, castigated from all sides for his disgraceful innings. Even today, it is not fully clear as to why he played so slowly in that match, although Gavaskar claimed that he was out of form at the time.

India next played East Africa at Headingley in Leeds and as expected, won the match, thanks to disciplined bowling from medium pacer Madan Lal (3/15) which restricted East Africa to 120. In the chase, Gavaskar made amends for his atrocious innings against England with a fine half-century (65 not out from 86 balls, 9 fours). Supported by Engineer (54 not out from 93 balls, 7 fours), the duo hammered the amateurish East African bowling and steered India to a facile victory without losing a wicket. India's last match in the Group stage was a must-win encounter against New Zealand at Old Trafford in Manchester. Batting first, India scored 230, with Syed Abid Ali scoring a half-century (70 from 98 balls, 5 fours and 1 six) to make up for the top-order failure. However, the Indian bowlers were then completely hammered by Kiwi opener Glenn Turner, who scored his second century of the tournament (114 not out from 177 balls, 13 fours) as New Zealand chased down the target without much hassle. India crashed out of the tournament with this loss and finished 3rd in their group with 1 win and 2 losses.

Not much positives could come out of India's campaign in the inaugural World Cup. From an Indian perspective, the tournament continues to be known for Gavaskar's notorious innings against England. Still, Gavaskar scored the highest number of runs for India in the tournament, with 113. Among the bowlers, Abid Ali, with his 6 wickets, was the best bowler for India.

The Indian Squad that took part in the 1975 World Cup comprised
 Srinivasaraghavan Venkataraghavan  (captain)
 Bishen Singh Bedi (vice-captain)
 Anshuman Gaekwad
 Brijesh Patel
 Eknath Solkar
 Farokh Engineer (wicketkeeper)
 Gundappa Vishwanath (reserve wicketkeeper)
 Karsan Ghavri
 Madan Lal
 Mohinder Amarnath
 Sunil Gavaskar
 Syed Abid Ali
India's record: 1−2 (Group B, 3rd place)
West Indies's record: 5−0 (champions)

India at the 1979 World Cup

 NR means No result.

The second edition of the Cricket World Cup was held in 1979 once again in England and with the same tournament format as in 1975. Like in 1975, India were not having much experience in playing ODI cricket and were still neglecting the limited-overs format of the game, so they were not considered favourites to win the Cup. Still, India were expected to put up a decent show as the team for the World Cup had world-class batsmen in Sunil Gavaskar, Gundappa Vishwanath and Dilip Vengsarkar, two members of the Indian spin quartet in captain Srinivasaraghavan Venkataraghavan and Bishen Singh Bedi and decent all rounders in Mohinder Amarnath and a rising talent in Kapil Dev, though regular wicketkeeper Syed Kirmani was surprisingly dropped. India were grouped along with the defending champions, the West Indies, who were now the best team in international cricket, New Zealand and non-Test playing nation Sri Lanka in Group B in the Group stage.

India opened their campaign with a massive loss against the West Indies at Edgbaston in Birmingham. The West Indian fast bowling attack led by Michael Holding (4/33) and Andy Roberts (2/32) never allowed the Indian batsmen to settle down, and with only Vishwanath (75 from 134 balls, 7 fours) showing resistance, India were bowled all out for 190 in the 54th over. In reply, West Indian opener Gordon Greenidge scored an unbeaten century as the Caribbeans effortlessly chased down the target with the loss of just a single wicket. India were knocked out of the tournament in their next match against New Zealand at Headingley in Leeds, which was another one-sided match. A combined effort from the New Zealand bowling attack saw India crash to 182 all out, with the only significant contribution coming from Gavaskar (55 from 144 balls, 5 fours). Kiwi opener Bruce Edgar then scored an unbeaten 84 in the chase as New Zealand won without any hassle. India played for pride in their last match of the tournament against Sri Lanka at Old Trafford in Manchester and were expected to win against the minnows. But they lost this match too. Chasing 239 to win, none of the Indian batsmen could  manage even a half-century against the Sri Lankan bowling attack comprising Tony Opatha (3/31), Stanley de Silva (2/36) and Somachandra de Silva (3/29). India were bowled all-out for just 191, finishing their World Cup campaign winless and last in their group.

It was a nightmarish campaign for India, with no wins and none of the players contributing. The fact that India as a team were not able to score even 200 runs in a single match, that only Vishwanath crossed three-figures in terms of the total number of individual runs scored (106) with only him and Gavaskar scoring a half-century each, and that only Amarnath, with 4 wickets, and Kapil, with 2 wickets, took wickets in all the 3 matches, showed how horrible and pathetic the Indian performance was in the World Cup. This dismal performance generated an uproar in India. The tournament marked the end of the road for the now struggling Indian spin quartet, with its two members in the World Cup side, Bedi and Venkataraghavan, bowling really poorly and not even taking a single wicket. Following the World Cup and the subsequent series against England, Bedi retired from international cricket, while Venkataraghavan was sacked as captain and also dropped from the team. None of the 4 members of the spin quartet ever played in a World Cup again.

The Indian Squad that took part in the 1979 World Cup comprised
 Srinivasaraghavan Venkataraghavan (captain)
 Sunil Gavaskar (vice-captain)
 Anshuman Gaekwad
 Bharath Reddy (reserve wicketkeeper)
 Bishen Singh Bedi
 Brijesh Patel
 Dilip Vengsarkar
 Gundappa Vishwanath
 Kapil Dev
 Karsan Ghavri
 Mohinder Amarnath
 Surinder Khanna (wicketkeeper)
 Yashpal Sharma
India's record: 0−3 (Group B, 4th place)
West Indies's record: 4−0 and 1 washout (champions)

India Won at the 1983 World Cup

 NR means No result.

Going by India's past record in one-day internationals and in the World Cup, they were not expected to even progress beyond the Group stage of the 1983 Cricket World Cup which was yet again held in England, despite having the likes of Sunil Gavaskar, Krishnamachari Srikkanth, Dilip Vengsarkar, Yashpal Sharma and Sandeep Patil in batting and a decent set of all-rounders in captain Kapil Dev, who was now one of the best all-rounders in world cricket, Mohinder Amarnath, Madan Lal, Ravi Shastri and Roger Binny. This time, the tournament format was slightly different from the previous editions. Teams were still divided among 2 groups of 4, but now each team in a group played each other twice. India were placed in Group B in the Group stage, which was considered to be the tougher of the 2 groups as it included 2 stronger opponents in the defending champions, the West Indies, whose dominance in world cricket at the time was at its peak, and Australia. World Cup debutants Zimbabwe were also in the group. The fact that the West Indies and Australia were in India's group only worsened India's prospects of putting a decent showing this time around.

India's first match in the tournament was against the West Indies at Old Trafford in Manchester. The West Indians were expected to steamroll India, but India caused a massive upset, winning the game by 34 runs in a match spread over 2 days. Middle-order batsman Sharma withstood the West Indian pace attack to score a fine half-century (89 from 120 balls, 9 fours) as India scored 262/8. Then, a disciplined performance from the Indian bowlers led by all-rounders Binny (3/48) and Shastri (3/26) ensured that the West Indian batsmen could not settle down after their starts, as a result of which the West Indies were bowled all out for 228. India followed this victory with another win against Zimbabwe at Leicester. In a one-sided match, India, bowling first, restricted Zimbabwe to 155 with Madan Lal taking 3/27, following which a half-century by Patil (50 from 54 balls, 7 fours, 1 six) ensured that India chased down the paltry total easily.

However, despite the good start, 2 consecutive defeats against Australia at Trent Bridge in Nottingham and the West Indies at The Oval in London followed, and with other results going Australia's and the West Indies' way, India were once again staring at another early exit from the World Cup. Trevor Chappell scored 110 to ensure that Australia scored a mammoth 320/9, with India dishing out a listless bowling performance. Only Kapil bowled well, taking a 5-wicket haul (5/43). Australian medium-pacer Ken MacLeay took 6/39 as India were bowled all out for just 158, losing by 162 runs, with none of the Indian batsmen contributing. Against the West Indies, India, chasing 283 to win, never really got going despite Amarnath's patient knock (80 from 139 balls). A combined effort from the West Indian pace attack saw India crash to 216 all out, losing by 66 runs. To add to India's woes, Vengsarkar was ruled out for the rest of the tournament after a Malcolm Marshall bouncer injured his jaw. To reach the semifinals now, India had to beat Zimbabwe and Australia by huge margins, a daunting prospect. Should India lose even one of the matches, they would be knocked out of the tournament.

India began their match against Zimbabwe at Tunbridge Wells on 18 June 1983 disastrously. The Zimbabwean bowling attack, led by Peter Rawson (3/47) and Kevin Curran (3/65), destroyed the Indian top order, reducing them to 17/5. A massive upset by the Zimbabweans and another early exit for India was now very much on the cards, until Kapil arrived. Kapil completely changed the course of the match with a breathtaking innings (175 not out from 138 balls, 16 fours, 6 sixes). With the support of the tailenders, he ransacked the Zimbabwean bowling as he played his most famous innings, which was also the highest individual score in ODI cricket at the time and the first ever ODI century scored by an Indian batsman. As a result of his astounding knock, India finished the innings at 266/8. Then, a good performance with the ball from Madan Lal (3/42) saw Zimbabwe being bowled all out for 235, despite Curran's 73, to set up a famous win. Unfortunately, this match was not telecasted live due to a strike by the BBC staff on that day. But India's woes weren't over yet; they needed to beat Australia comprehensively to have any hope of reaching the semifinals.

India's must-win match against the Aussies took place at Chelmsford, two days after the famous victory against Zimbabwe. Despite Rodney Hogg (3/40) and Jeff Thomson (3/51) taking 3 wickets each, a combined effort from the Indian batsmen saw India reach 247 all out. Australia, chasing 248 to win, were rocked by the innocuous but penetrative medium-pace of Madan Lal (4/20) and Binny (4/29) and crashed to 129 all out, losing the match by a whopping 118 runs. With another win under their belt, India finished second in their group and qualified for the semifinals for the first time ever in the Cricket World Cup.

India's semifinal match was against hosts England at Manchester. Despite England being the favourites, India produced yet another upset. England won the toss and batted first. Despite an opening stand of 69, the English batsmen mistimed many balls and used the bat's edge frequently, as the restrictive Indian bowling led England to 213 all out. English opener Graeme Fowler top scored with 33. Kapil Dev was the pick of the Indian bowlers (3/35), with Amarnath (2/27) and Binny (2/43) also being among the wickets. In reply, Sharma (61 from 115 balls, 3 fours, 2 sixes) and Sandeep Patil (51 not out from 32 balls, 8 fours) made half-centuries, with Amarnath (46 from 92 balls, 4 fours, 1 six) too contributing, as India reached their target comfortably, winning by 6 wickets in a classic victory over the hosts. Amarnath picked up the Man of the Match award for his all-round performance. This win brought India to the World Cup final for the very first time, which was to be played against the West Indies on 25 June 1983 at Lord's in London. A third consecutive tournament victory for the West Indies was widely predicted by most pundits and fans.

In the final, India lost the toss and were made to bat first on a seaming wicket against the mighty West Indian pace attack. Only Srikkanth (38 from 57 balls, 7 fours and 1 six) and Amarnath (26 from 80 balls, 3 fours) put up any significant resistance as the West Indian fast bowling attack comprising Marshall (2/24), Andy Roberts (3/32), Joel Garner (1/24) and Michael Holding (2/26) ripped through the Indian batting, ably supported by part-timer Larry Gomes (2/49). Only surprising resistance by the tail allowed India to reach 183 all out in the 55th over. It seemed to be all over for India, as the West Indies had a power-packed batting line-up comprising openers Gordon Greenidge and Desmond Haynes, followed by Vivian Richards and captain Clive Lloyd which was capable of destroying any bowling attack and were widely expected to make mincemeat out of the "mediocre" Indian bowling attack. Despite the early loss of Greenidge, Haynes and Richards steadied the innings and the West Indies was soon cruising to another World Cup win at 57/2. At this stage, Kapil ran a great distance (18-20 yards) to take the wicket of Richards off Madan Lal's bowling. This proved to be the turning point of the match, as the Indian bowling then exploited the weather and pitch conditions perfectly to blow away the rest of the West Indian batting. Amarnath (3/12) and Madan Lal (3/31) took three wickets each, as the West Indies crashed to 140 all out in the 53rd over, setting up a famous tournament victory for India which was one of the biggest upsets not only in cricket, but in sport in general. India's win ended the title defence of the West Indies, who never reached the final of the Cricket World Cup again. Amarnath was awarded a second consecutive Man of the Match award for another all-round effort.

Apart from the win, there were statistically many other achievements for India in the 1983 World Cup. Binny and Madan Lal, with 18 and 17 wickets respectively, were the tournament's top two bowlers. While Kapil, with 303 runs, was India's best batsman and one of the top 10 batsmen in terms of total individual runs, he also took the most catches in the tournament, with 7, and was India's only centurion. Kapil's 175 not out against Zimbabwe was the first ODI century scored by an Indian batsman and remained the highest individual score in ODI cricket until Vivian Richards broke that record the following year. It also remained the highest individual score by an Indian batsman in ODI cricket until Sourav Ganguly broke that record in 1999. Wicketkeeper Syed Kirmani, with 14 dismissals, finished just below West Indian wicketkeeper Jeff Dujon in the most dismissals taken by a wicketkeeper in the tournament.

India's 1983 World Cup victory was a major turning point for Indian as well as world cricket. The win boosted the popularity of cricket in India, which was until then restricted to the urban areas. It also increased the popularity of one-day cricket in India as well as in general. India began to take ODI cricket seriously after the World Cup win and soon emerged as one of the best teams in ODI cricket. Indian corporates too started to take an interest in cricket and began to sponsor many international tournaments, marking the start of the rise of India as the leading financial power in cricket.

The Indian Squad that won the 1983 World Cup comprised
 Kapil Dev (captain)
 Sunil Gavaskar 
 Balwinder Singh Sandhu
 Dilip Vengsarkar
 Kirti Azad
 Krishnamachari Srikkanth
 Madan Lal
 Mohinder Amarnath(vice captain)
 Ravi Shastri
 Roger Binny
 Sandeep Patil
 Sunil Valson
 Syed Kirmani (wicketkeeper)
 Yashpal Sharma (reserve wicketkeeper)
India's record: 6−2 (champions)

India at the 1987 World Cup

 NR means No result.

The World Cup moved out of England for the first time in 1987, with India and Pakistan co-hosting this edition of the World Cup. India were billed pre-tournament favourites and were widely expected to defend their title successfully in familiar conditions. India's team for the World Cup did not have some important members of the World Cup-winning squad of 1983, notably Mohinder Amarnath, Syed Kirmani, Madan Lal, Yashpal Sharma and Sandeep Patil, but all-rounder Kapil Dev once again led the side, which included world-class batsmen in veteran Sunil Gavaskar, who was to retire from all forms of cricket after the tournament, Krishnamachari Srikkanth, Dilip Vengsarkar, Ravi Shastri, Mohammed Azharuddin and Kapil. The bowling too was decent enough, with Kapil leading the attack, supported by Shastri, Maninder Singh, Manoj Prabhakar, Chetan Sharma and Roger Binny. The 1983 World Cup format was again used for the tournament, but the matches were reduced to 50-overs-a-side, keeping in mind the shorter days in the Indian subcontinent. In the Group stage, India were placed alongside Australia, New Zealand and then-associates Zimbabwe in Group A, which was considered to be the easier of the 2 groups.

India played the very first match of the tournament against Australia at Madras, which was arguably the most eventful match of the tournament. Australia won the match by just 1 run, after piling up 270/6 in their first innings, helped by opener Geoff Marsh's 110. India began their innings brightly and were cruising to an easy victory at 207/2, thanks to half-centuries from Srikkanth (70 from 83 balls, 7 fours) and debutant Navjot Singh Sidhu (73 from 79 balls, 4 fours and 5 sixes), until Sidhu fell. This was followed by a spectacular middle-order collapse that made India lose their last 8 wickets for just 62 runs. India were all out for 269 with one ball remaining in the match, which was a heartbreaking loss for the defending champions. Their next match against New Zealand at Bangalore was also dramatic, with Sidhu (75 from 71 balls, 4 fours and 4 sixes) once again rescuing India after India had fallen to 21/3, and along with Kapil (72 not out from 58 balls, 4 fours and 1 six), destroyed the New Zealand bowling attack to take India to 252/7. India eventually pulled off a 16-run victory thanks to some economical bowling from Shastri (2/45) and part-timer Azharuddin (1/11), India thus registering its first win in the tournament.

India dominated the rest of the Group stage with 2 one-sided victories against Zimbabwe at Bombay and Ahmedabad, followed by wins against Australia and New Zealand at New Delhi and Nagpur respectively. India dished out a clinical performance against the Aussies, with 4 Indian batsmen: Gavaskar (61 from 72 balls, 7 fours), Sidhu (51 from 70 balls, 2 fours), Vengsarkar (63 from 60 balls, 3 fours and 2 sixes) and Azharuddin (54 not out from 45 balls, 5 fours and 1 six): scoring half-centuries as India posted an imposing 289/6. Maninder (3/34) and Azharuddin (3/19) then contributed with the ball as Australia crashed to 233 all out in the 49th over. India's last match in the Group stage against New Zealand was noted as the match in which Gavaskar scored his first and only ODI century (103 not out from 88 balls, 10 fours and 3 sixes). Supported by Srikkanth (75 from 58 balls, 9 fours and 3 sixes), Gavaskar toyed with the New Zealand bowling attack with an attacking innings uncharacteristic of his typical dour and rock-like approach as India chased down New Zealand's modest score of 221/9 with the loss of only Srikkanth's wicket and 18 overs to spare. Gavaskar and Srikkanth added 136 runs for the 2nd wicket. Also notable in this match was Chetan Sharma's hat-trick, the first ever both by an Indian bowler and in the World Cup. His hat-trick involved the wickets of Ken Rutherford, wicketkeeper Ian Smith and tailender Ewen Chatfield. Sharma finished with figures of 3/51. With 5 wins and 1 loss from 6 matches, India topped their group and qualified for the semifinals, where they were to play England at Bombay.

The semifinal, which took place on 5 November 1987, saw India winning the toss and choosing to field first. England dominated the match from the start, with opener Graham Gooch scoring an impressive 115 and ably supported by captain Mike Gatting, who contributed with 56, the duo sharing a partnership of 117 for the 3rd wicket. England posted a strong score of 254/6, with only Maninder (3/54) and Kapil (2/38) bowling well for India. India faltered in the chase, with only Azharuddin (64 from 74 balls, 7 fours) making any significant contribution for India. The Indian batsmen completely faltered against off-spinner Eddie Hemmings (4/52) and fast bowler Neil Foster (3/47) as India were bowled all out for 219 in the 46th over. It was a heartbreaking loss for India, ending their title defence. This was Gavaskar's last ever cricket match.

Though India were unable to defend their title successfully, there were a lot of positives for India. Firstly, Gavaskar, in his final tournament, scored 300 runs, the highest for India, and was one of the top ten batsmen in terms of runs scored and the only centurion for India. Secondly, the partnership of 136 between Gavaskar and Srikkanth against New Zealand at Nagpur was the highest partnership for any wicket in the tournament. Thirdly, left-arm spinner Maninder Singh was the best bowler for India with 14 wickets and was the best spinner of the tournament, coming at 4th place among the tournament's highest wicket takers, with only fast bowlers Craig McDermott, Imran Khan and Patrick Patterson above him. Finally, wicketkeeper Kiran More, with 11 dismissals, effected the most dismissals in the tournament, while Kapil, with 6 catches, took the most catches.

The Indian Squad that made the semifinals of the 1987 World Cup comprised
 Kapil Dev (captain)
 Dilip Vengsarkar (vice-captain)
 Chandrakant Pandit (reserve wicketkeeper)
 Chetan Sharma
 Kiran More (wicketkeeper)
 Krishnamachari Srikkanth
 Laxman Sivaramakrishnan
 Maninder Singh
 Manoj Prabhakar
 Mohammed Azharuddin
 Navjot Singh Sidhu
 Ravi Shastri
 Roger Binny
 Sunil Gavaskar
India's record: 5−2 (semifinalists)
Australia's record: 7−1 (champions)

India at the 1992 World Cup

 NR means No result.

India were not expected to perform well in the 1992 World Cup co-hosted by Australia and New Zealand, despite playing a Test series (and also the World Series Cup involving both Australia and the West Indies) in Australia just prior to the World Cup. The Indian team for the World Cup had a good batting line up consisting of captain Mohammed Azharuddin, destructive opener Krishnamachari Srikkanth, all rounders Kapil Dev and Ravi Shastri, Sanjay Manjrekar and a rising talent in Sachin Tendulkar. The bowling wasn't too strong though. Kapil led the bowling line up, which also included Shastri, Manoj Prabhakar and Venkatapathy Raju. A new format was introduced for the 1992 World Cup, with the group format being scrapped in favour of a round-robin format, where each team would play all the other 8 teams in the tournament once, with the top 4 teams at the end of the Round-Robin stage progressing to the semifinals. It was also the first Cricket World Cup played with coloured jerseys and which had day-night matches.

India's first match in the tournament was against England at Perth. Chasing 237, India never really got going despite a 63-run opening stand shared by Shastri (57 from 112 balls, 2 fours) and Srikkanth (39 from 50 balls, 7 fours) and a good knock from Tendulkar (35 from 44 balls, 5 fours). India crashed to 227 all out, losing by nine runs, with Dermot Reeve (3/38) taking the most wickets for England. Three of India's batsmen: Shastri, Pravin Amre and Kiran More: were run out. India's next match against Sri Lanka at Mackay was abandoned due to rain after just 2 balls and a run scored by Srikkanth, giving India its first points in the tournament. India then played co-hosts and defending champions Australia at Brisbane. The match was a thriller. Australia scored 237/9 in its 50 overs, with Dean Jones scoring 90. Kapil and Prabhakar were the pick of the bowlers with identical figures of 3/41. Due to rain, India's target was revised to 235 and the overs reduced to 47. Azharuddin led India's reply with a near-century (93 from 102 balls, 10 fours), but the rest of India's batsmen were unable to cross 50 and with Prabhakar (1 from 1 ball) and Raju (0 from 1 ball) run out in successive balls, India crashed to 234 all out in the second-last ball of the innings, ensuring that Australia scraped to victory by 1 run.

India's next match was against arch-rivals Pakistan at Sydney. It was the first time ever in the history of the Cricket World Cup that India and Pakistan played each other and therefore, the match was highly anticipated. India won the toss and batted first, posting a modest 216/7 in a match reduced to 49 overs due to rain, with the top contributors being Tendulkar (54 not out from 62 balls, 3 fours) and rookie opener Ajay Jadeja (46 from 77 balls, 2 fours). Pakistan's leg-spinner Mushtaq Ahmed was the pick of Pakistan's bowlers, taking 3/59, while fast bowler Aaqib Javed was economical, taking 2/28 in his 8 overs. In Pakistan's reply, only opener Aamer Sohail, who scored 62, could cross 50 runs with Kapil (2/30), Prabhakar (2/22) and rookie Javagal Srinath (2/37) taking 2 wickets each, as Pakistan crashed to 173 all out in the 49th over, losing by 43 runs, earning India its first win in the tournament, a famous victory which would begin an all-win record over the arch-rivals in subsequent Cricket World Cups (both 50-over and 20-over). The match also had its share of drama which is a regular feature in Indo-Pak cricket matches, with Javed Miandad imitating Indian wicketkeeper Kiran More's appealing behind the stumps. Tendulkar won his first Man of the Match award in a World Cup for his allround performance (54* and 1/37, picking up the prized wicket of Aamer Sohail). However, India's time was running out and they had to play really well from then on to have any chance of reaching the semifinals.

India then moved on to New Zealand for the second half of the tournament. Their first match in New Zealand was against minnows Zimbabwe at Hamilton. India won the rain-curtailed match as expected, with Tendulkar (81 from 77 balls, 8 fours and 1 six) playing an aggressive knock as India posted 203/7. Zimbabwe, chasing 159 in 19 overs after a rain delay, could only score 104/1 in the 19 overs, Tendulkar taking the lone wicket. Tendulkar received his second Man of the Match award in the Cricket World Cup for his contribution in the match. But now India needed to win their last three matches comprehensively and also depend on other results to reach the semifinals.

India next played the West Indies at Wellington. The West Indies were slowly declining at the time with the retirements of several key players, yet were still a dangerous opponent. India lost the match. Only Azharuddin (61 from 84 balls, 4 fours) showed any sort of resistance against the pace attack of Curtly Ambrose  (2/24) and Anderson Cummins (4/33) as India were bowled all out for 197. The West Indies comfortably reached their target of 195 (with the score and number of overs being reduced by rain again) with 6 overs to spare. India crashed out of the tournament with this loss, with their last two matches against co-hosts New Zealand at Dunedin and World Cup debutants South Africa back in Australia at Adelaide reduced to dead rubbers. India lost both the one-sided matches. Only Tendulkar (84 from 107 balls, 6 fours) and Azharuddin (55 from 98 balls, 3 fours and 1 six) made any significant contribution in India's score of 230/6, which New Zealand easily chased down. Against South Africa, in a match reduced to 30 overs due to rain, the only person who contributed for India was Azharuddin (79 from 77 balls, 6 fours). India scored 180/6, which South Africa chased down without much effort. With only 2 wins and 1 abandoned match, India finished 7th in the Round-Robin stage, just above Sri Lanka and Zimbabwe. It was the first time since 1979 that India could not qualify for the semifinals of the World Cup. Ironically, Pakistan, one of the only 2 teams which India defeated, would go on to win the World Cup.

There were not much positives India could take from the tournament. No Indian batsman was able to score a century and no Indian bowler could take more than 3 wickets in an innings. India's highest scorer in the tournament was Azharuddin, who scored 332 runs. Tendulkar followed with a total score of 283 runs. Among the bowlers, Prabhakar was the best for India, taking 12 wickets. The tournament marked the end of Srikkanth's international career, as he was dropped after the World Cup and retired from all forms of cricket the following year.

The Indian Squad that took part in the 1992 World Cup comprised

 Mohammed Azharuddin (captain)
 Ravi Shastri (vice-captain)
 Ajay Jadeja
 Javagal Srinath
 Kapil Dev
 Kiran More (wicketkeeper)
 Krishnamachari Srikkanth
 Manoj Prabhakar
 Pravin Amre
 Sachin Tendulkar
 Sanjay Manjrekar (reserve wicketkeeper)
 Subroto Banerjee
 Venkatapathy Raju
 Vinod Kambli
India's record: 2−5 and 1 abandoned match (Round-Robin, 7th place)
Pakistan's record: 6−3 and 1 abandoned match (champions)

India at the 1996 World Cup

 NR means No result.

India were the co-hosts of the 1996 Cricket World Cup along with Pakistan and Sri Lanka and were expected to perform well at home. Their batting was their strongest point, with Sachin Tendulkar, captain Mohammed Azharuddin, Ajay Jadeja, Navjot Singh Sidhu,  Vinod Kambli and Sanjay Manjrekar together forming the strongest batting line-up in the tournament. While the bowling was a bit suspect, the team had a decent set of bowlers who were good at home conditions in Anil Kumble, Javagal Srinath, Manoj Prabhakar and Venkatapathy Raju. The group format was reintroduced for the tournament, with teams divided into 2 groups of 6 teams each, with the top 4 teams from each group entering the quarterfinals, where a team from one group in the Group stage would play a single match against a team which qualified from the other group. In the Group stage, India were placed in Group A with co-hosts Sri Lanka, Australia, the West Indies, Zimbabwe and World Cup debutants Kenya.

India started their World cup campaign well by defeating Kenya at Cuttack, first restricting them to 199/6 with Kumble taking 3/28 and then chasing it down easily to win by 7 wickets due to Tendulkar's century (127 not out from 138 balls, 15 fours, 1 six). India's next match against the West Indies at Gwalior went much the same way: after bowling the West Indies side out for 173 with Kumble capturing 3/35 and Prabhakar 3/39, Tendulkar (70 runs, 91 balls, 8 fours) led the way to another victory.

India then faced tournament favourites Australia at Bombay, and the tourists batted first after winning the toss. Mark Waugh's 126 and Australian captain Mark Taylor's 59 set the foundation with a 103 run opening stand. Australia suffered five run-outs, four in the last ten overs whilst chasing quick runs, with medium-pacer Venkatesh Prasad and Raju taking two wickets each. India's chase started poorly, with Jadeja and Vinod Kambli dismissed by Damien Fleming with only seven runs scored. Tendulkar (90 from 84 balls, 14 fours, 1 six) counter-attacked ferociously, and India were well ahead of the required run rate at 143/3 when Tendulkar charged a wide from Mark Waugh and was stumped for 90. From there onward, the run chase began to falter, with only Manjrekar managing a half century (62 from 91 balls, 7 fours), resulting in a 16-run loss, dismissed for 242 in the 48th over.

India next faced Sri Lanka at New Delhi. Tendulkar hit another run-a-ball century (137 from 137 balls, 8 fours, 5 sixes) and Azharuddin made 72 from 80 balls in a 175 run partnership as India compiled 271/3. However, the opening pair of Romesh Kaluwitharana and Sanath Jayasuriya launched Sri Lanka to 42 after just three overs. Jayasuriya managed to score 79 from 77 balls, leaving the score at 4/141. With the run-rate under control, Sri Lankan captain Arjuna Ranatunga (46 not out from 63 balls) and Hashan Tillakaratne (70 not out from 98 balls) made a 131 run partnership to steer them to a six wicket win with eight balls remaining. Kumble led the bowling with 2/39 whilst Prabhakar was punished for 47 runs in four overs.

India ended the group stage with a win against Zimbabwe at Kanpur, who won the toss and sent the Indians in to bat. After slumping to 32/3, opener Sidhu (80 from 116 balls, 5 fours) and Kambli (106 from 110 balls, 11 fours) put on 142 runs before Jadeja finished off the innings with 44 not out from 27 balls, with India scoring 247/5. The Zimbabweans lost wickets at regular intervals and fell 40 runs short, with Raju taking 3/30 and Kumble, Srinath and Jadeja two each. With this win, India finished third in their group and qualified for the quarterfinals, setting up a match against arch-rivals and defending champions Pakistan at Bangalore.

The match was widely anticipated and had a huge leadup. Pakistani captain Wasim Akram withdrew due to injury. India elected to bat after winning the toss, with Sidhu (93 from 115 balls, 11 fours) and Tendulkar (31 off 59 balls, 3 fours) reaching 90 before Tendulkar was dismissed by Pakistan fast bowler Ata-ur-Rehman. Although wickets fell regularly, with all Pakistani bowlers barring part-timer Salim Malik among the wickets, the Indians continued to score quickly, with Jadeja making a rapid 45 from 25 balls in the final overs, including 40 from Waqar Younis' last two overs. India scored 287/8 in their 50 overs. Prasad and Kumble then took three wickets each to restrict Pakistan to 248/9, despite their strong start due to a quick 55 from Pakistan's stand-in-captain and opener Aamer Sohail, to complete a memorable victory and qualify for the semifinals, making it 2 wins in 2 World Cup matches against the arch-rivals. This resulted in widespread disappointment in Pakistan, leading to a government inquiry, crowd demonstrations outside players' homes and the suicide of one distraught fan.

In the semifinals at the Eden Gardens in Calcutta on 13 March 1996, India played Sri Lanka in a match which became notorious for the extremely poor crowd behaviour. India won the toss and chose to field first. Both the openers Kaluwitharana and Jayasuriya were dismissed in Srinath's first over, uppercutting wide balls down to third man. Srinath then removed veteran Asanka Gurusinha to leave the score at 35/3. However half centuries from Aravinda de Silva and Roshan Mahanama helped Sri Lanka reach a formidable total of 251/8. India made a solid start, with Sachin Tendulkar (65 from 88 balls, 9 fours) scoring a half-century and taking India to 1/98. However, the pitch began to crumble and take more spin, and when Tendulkar was stumped, the remaining Indian batsmen were unable to cope with the four pronged spin-attack of Jayasuriya, Muttiah Muralitharan and part timers de Silva and Kumar Dharmasena, who altogether took 6 wickets as India lost 7 wickets for 22 runs to slump to 120/8 in the 35th over, with still 132 runs to win. At this point, sections of the crowd began setting fire to the stands and throwing missiles onto the field. Play was stopped as the crowd's anger began to develop into a dangerous riot. The umpires and match referee Clive Lloyd decided to award the game to Sri Lanka because India had no chance of winning from their current position in the match even if the match were to resume, knocking them out of the World Cup.

India's campaign was highlighted by the consistency of Tendulkar, who managed 50 plus scores in all but two matches. With 523 runs at an average of 87.16, Tendulkar was the leading run scorer in the tournament, with two of his six dismissals due to run outs rather than batting errors. His 137 against Sri Lanka was the 4th highest score in the tournament and his partnership of 175 with Azharuddin the 4th highest partnership in the tournament. No other Indian batsmen aggregated 250 runs. India were also bolstered by the performances of leg-spinner Kumble, who was  the leading wicket taker in the tournament with 15 wickets at 18.73 apiece and also made the most catches (eight). Raju, Prasad and Srinath were tied in 10th spot with eight wickets each. Veteran all-rounder Manoj Prabhakar retired from international cricket in the middle of the tournament after being dropped for poor performance.

The Indian Squad that made the semifinals of the 1996 World Cup comprised

 Mohammed Azharuddin (captain)
 Sachin Tendulkar (vice-captain)
 Aashish Kapoor
 Ajay Jadeja
 Anil Kumble
 Javagal Srinath
 Manoj Prabhakar
 Navjot Singh Sidhu
 Nayan Mongia (wicketkeeper)
 Salil Ankola
 Sanjay Manjrekar (reserve wicketkeeper)
 Venkatapathy Raju
 Venkatesh Prasad
 Vinod Kambli
India's record: 4−3 (semifinalists)
Sri Lanka's record: 8−0 with 2 matches won by walkovers (champions)

India at the 1999 World Cup

 NR means No result.

The 1999 Cricket World Cup in England was one in which India were not expected to perform too well. Despite having the likes of Sachin Tendulkar, Sourav Ganguly, Rahul Dravid, Ajay Jadeja and captain Mohammed Azharuddin in batting and Anil Kumble, Javagal Srinath and Venkatesh Prasad in bowling, they weren't having too much of a good run, losing to arch-rivals Pakistan in the finals of 2 consecutive triangular tournaments at home and at Sharjah. The format used for the tournament was slightly different from the 1996 format. Teams were divided into 2 groups of 6 teams each, with the top 3 teams in each group progressing to the Super Six stage, where a team belonging to one group in the Group stage would play once against all 3 teams belonging to the other group. India were placed in Group A in the Group stage along with hosts England, defending champions Sri Lanka, South Africa, Zimbabwe and minnows Kenya.

India began their campaign with a close loss to South Africa at Hove in the final overs of the match. Although South Africa won by 4 wickets, the match was not without drama as South Africa had to score had approximately a run a ball in the last 10 overs. The match featured a good performance from Ganguly (97 from 142 balls, 11 fours, 1 six) and Dravid (54 from 75 balls, 5 fours). None of the bowlers backed up the batting performance however, with Srinath the leading wicket-taker despite being very expensive, taking 2 wickets and conceding 69 runs. South Africa scored runs more quickly than India did, with Jacques Kallis (96 from 128 balls) leading the way. India next played Zimbabwe at Leicester, without the services of Tendulkar, as the star batsman had returned to India due to his father's death. The match was a thriller, with India losing in the end by 3 runs. The tailenders embarrassed supporters as India, chasing 252, went from 246/7 to 249 all out with 3 overs left, with Zimbabwean fast bowler Henry Olonga taking 3/22.

India made up for their early losses with a very convincing win over Kenya at Bristol by 94 runs four days later. India scored a massive 329/2 through centuries from Tendulkar (140 not out from 101 balls, 16 fours, 3 sixes), who had rejoined the team, and Dravid (104 not out from 109 balls, 10 fours). The pair scored 237 in 29 overs at a run rate of 8.17 before medium pacer Debashish Mohanty wiped up the Kenyan batsmen with a 4-wicket haul (4/56). Tendulkar, declared Man of the Match, later dedicated his ton to his late father. India followed this victory with a record win against Sri Lanka at Taunton by 157 runs. Ganguly (183 from 158 balls, 17 fours, 7 sixes) and Dravid (145 from 129 balls, 17 fours, 1 six) picked up two centuries at over a run a ball to get India to a mammoth total of 373/6, sharing a partnership of 318 runs in 44.9 overs. Sri Lanka were then rattled due to Robin Singh's 5/31, crashing to 216 all out. India then went on to seal a place in the Super Six stage with a win against hosts England at Edgbaston in Birmingham by 63 runs; in a match extended by a day due to rain, once again Ganguly (40 from 59 balls, 6 fours) and Dravid (53 from 82 balls, 6 fours) starred with the bat to score 232/8, while a strong team effort with the ball, led by Ganguly's 3/27, got England all out for just 169.

Despite India finishing second in Group A, they began the Super Six stage with no points due to the controversial Byzantine points system which gave a team 2 points at the start of the Super Six stage for beating a team in the Group stage which had also qualified for the Super Six stage (India did not win against fellow qualifiers South Africa and Zimbabwe). India's first match in the Super Six stage was against Australia at The Oval in London, which they lost badly by 77 runs, with only Jadeja (100 not out from 138 balls, 7 fours, 2 sixes) and Robin Singh (75 from 94 balls, 5 fours, 3 sixes) putting up any resistance. Mark Waugh's 83 and Glenn McGrath's 3/34 took the match away from India. Due to this loss, India, in order to reach the semifinals, now not only had to beat Pakistan and New Zealand, they also had to depend on other results. India beat Pakistan in their next match at Old Trafford in Manchester by 47 runs, maintaining their all-win record over their arch-rivals in the World Cup. Dravid (61 from 89 balls, 4 fours) and Azharuddin (59 from 77 balls, 3 fours, 1 six), led the way as India posted a total of 227/6 in their 50 overs. Prasad then ripped through the Pakistani batting line-up, taking 5/27 as Pakistan were bowled all out for 180. The match was even more significant than usual as the two nations were at war with each other (see 1999 Kargil Conflict). Unfortunately, despite the win against Pakistan, India were soon eliminated from the tournament due to other results and their handicap in terms of points in the Super Six stage. India's last match in the Super Six stage against New Zealand at Trent Bridge in Nottingham was also the team's last match in the tournament. The match, reduced to a dead rubber since New Zealand had already qualified for the semifinals, was a thriller, with India losing in the end by 5 wickets as New Zealand achieved the target of 252 with just 8 balls to spare, despite a strong performance from Jadeja (76 from 103 balls, 6 fours, 2 six).

Despite having a mediocre tournament, there were many plus-points for India. The tournament marked the start of the domination of the Big 3 of Indian batting viz. Tendulkar, Dravid and Ganguly, all of whom showed remarkable consistency. Dravid, who until the start of the World Cup was criticised for not being good enough for one-day cricket, was involved in two mammoth partnerships and was the leading run-scorer of the entire tournament with 461 runs at an average of 65.85. The top 3 highest scores of the tournament were from Indians, which were Ganguly's 183, Dravid's 145 and Tendulkar's 140 not out. However, following the World Cup, Azharuddin, who had an indifferent tournament, was sacked as captain and was dropped from the team too.

The Indian Squad that took part in the 1999 World Cup comprised

 Mohammed Azharuddin (captain)
 Ajay Jadeja (vice-captain)
 Ajit Agarkar
 Amay Khurasiya
 Anil Kumble
 Debashish Mohanty
 Javagal Srinath
 Nayan Mongia (wicketkeeper)
 Nikhil Chopra
 Rahul Dravid (reserve wicketkeeper)
 Robin Singh
 Sachin Tendulkar
 Sadagoppan Ramesh
 Sourav Ganguly 
 Venkatesh Prasad
India's record: 4−4 (Super Six, 6th place)
Australia's record: 7−2 and 1 tie (champions)

India at the 2003 World Cup

 NR means No result.

Like in the previous World Cup, India began their 2003 Cricket World Cup campaign in South Africa and Zimbabwe on a string of poor performances, having just come off a disastrous tour of New Zealand. The 1999 World Cup format was retained for the tournament. The Indian team was somewhat stronger than the team representing them in the 1999 World Cup, but still contained the batting trio of Sachin Tendulkar, Rahul Dravid and Sourav Ganguly and the pace-spin duo of Javagal Srinath and Anil Kumble, now accompanied by rising talents Yuvraj Singh, Zaheer Khan, Harbhajan Singh, Mohammed Kaif and Virender Sehwag. In the Group stage, India were placed in Group A, accompanied by co-hosts Zimbabwe, defending champions Australia, arch-rivals Pakistan, England and minnows Holland and Namibia, who were playing their first World Cup.

India had a horrid beginning to the tournament. Their first match was against minnows Holland at Paarl, who tumbled the Indian batsmen out for just 204 (all out, 48.5 overs, 206 minutes), with only Tendulkar (52 from 72 balls, 7 fours) putting up resistance, although veterans Srinath and Kumble reverted the damage with 4 wickets each and India ended up winning by 68 runs, the unconvincing victory setting the stage for immense criticism. India's next match was against Australia at Centurion. The Indian team, batting first, was steadily making progress at 41/1 when disaster struck. Sehwag's wicket triggered a middle order collapse that left India struggling at 50/5 having lost 4 wickets for 9 runs. Tendulkar and Harbhajan offered some resistance but the damage was done as India were out for 125 (all out, 41.4 overs, 176 minutes). Australia scored the target in 22.2 overs, only losing one wicket. The Indian team's mediocre performance in the first two matches triggered uproar in India. Player effigies were said to be burnt on streets and the Board of Control for Cricket in India was under immense pressure to reshuffle the team at the end of the World Cup. This reaction at home may have triggered the Indian team's performance for the remainder of the World Cup.

India then travelled to Zimbabwe to play their third match against the co-hosts at Harare, lacking confidence. Tendulkar (81 from 91 balls, 10 fours) took India to 255 (7 wickets, 50 overs) and 3 wickets from Ganguly set the stage for a strong 83 run win by the Indians. This was followed by a 181 run thrashing handed out to minnows Namibia, back in South Africa at Pietermaritzburg. Tendulkar (152 from 151 balls, 18 fours) and Ganguly (112 from 119 balls, 6 fours, 4 sixes) both scored centuries, contributing to a second-wicket partnership of 244 runs in 39.5 overs to take India to 311 (2 wickets, 50 overs, 207 minutes). Namibia were then all out for 130 (all out, 42.3 overs, 163 minutes) thanks to 4 wickets from part-timer Yuvraj. The Man of the match was Tendulkar in both matches.

India finished off their engagements in Group A with an 82 run victory over England at Durban and a 6 wicket victory over Pakistan at Centurion. Paceman Ashish Nehra achieved 6/23 against England to help India defend 250 as England were all out for 168. The Indian batting was bolstered by half-centuries from Dravid (62 from 72 balls, 3 fours and 1 six) and Tendulkar (50 from 52 balls, 8 fours and 1 six), and an attacking cameo from Yuvraj (42 from 38 balls, 4 fours and 1 six). The match against Pakistan, the most anticipated match of the tournament, lived up to its billing and was a thriller. It was (and still is) noted for being a match in which Tendulkar played one of his best-ever ODI innings. Chasing 274, Tendulkar (98 from 75 balls, 12 fours, 1 six) pulled off a near century, only to get out after suffering from cramps, to guide India to an unlikely victory, maintaining India's unbeaten record over Pakistan in World Cups. Tendulkar was once again awarded the Man of the Match. With 5 victories and 1 loss from 6 matches, India finished second in Group A and qualified for the Super Six stage.

India were untroubled in the Super Six stage and continued their streak of strong performances with three wins out of three matches, earning them a berth in the semifinals. The wins were comfortable; beating Kenya at Cape Town by 6 wickets through a century from Ganguly (107 from 120 balls, 11 fours, 2 sixes); beating Sri Lanka at Johannesburg by 183 runs thanks to Tendulkar (97 from 120 balls, 7 fours and 1 six), Sehwag (66 from 76 balls, 5 fours, 3 sixes) and veteran Srinath's 4/35; and winning against New Zealand at Centurion by 7 wickets, due to Zaheer's 4/42 which bundled out the Black Caps for 146, followed by patient knocks from Kaif (68 not out off 129 balls, 8 fours) and Dravid (53 not out off 89 balls, 7 fours) in the chase.

In the semifinals, India played the surprise package of the tournament, Kenya, at Durban. The match was not dramatic. Tendulkar (83 from 101 balls, 5 fours, 1 six) and Ganguly (111 from 114 balls, 5 fours, 5 sixes) took India to 270/4 in their 50 overs, from where a combined bowling effort from India's bowlers got Kenya all out for 179. This brought India into the finals for the first time since 1983, where they faced a strong Australia, who had dominated the tournament from the start with an all-win record.

The final, played on 23 March 2003 at the Wanderers Stadium in Johannesburg, saw Ganguly electing to field first after winning the toss, in the hope that his pacers would exploit a damp pitch. However, the plan backfired completely on India as the Australians dominated from the very start, with the openers Adam Gilchrist and Matthew Hayden sharing a partnership of 105 runs for the 1st wicket, which was achieved in only 14 overs. Australian captain Ricky Ponting and Damien Martyn then scored 140 not out and 88 not out respectively, taking Australia to an Australian record of 359/2, a record that would not be beaten until 2006. Chasing a mammoth 360 to win, India never stood a chance after Tendulkar (4 from 5 balls, 1 four) lost his wicket early. Sehwag (82 from 81 balls, 10 fours, 3 sixes) and Dravid (47 from 57 balls, 2 fours) then steadied the innings, sharing a partnership of 88 runs which brought India to a decent 147/3 in the 24th over. With India scoring at 5.96 runs an over, it seemed that they would end up creating a miracle by winning the match, but the remaining Indian batsmen struggled against the Aussie pace attack of Glenn McGrath and Brett Lee and fell to cheap shots while trying to accelerate the scoring rate. India lost their last 7 wickets for only 87 runs and crashed to 234 all out in the 40th over, losing the match by 125 runs.

Though they finished the tournament as the runner up, there were a huge amount of bright sides for India. Firstly, Tendulkar was awarded the Man of the Tournament award for being the leading run scorer with 673 runs. Ganguly ended up as the second leading run scorer in the tournament, but 208 runs behind Tendulkar. Tendulkar's 152 against Namibia was the second highest score of the tournament and he achieved an average of 61.18. Secondly, there were upsides in the bowling department as well with Zaheer 4th on the wicket takers list. Finally, India as a team had achieved a streak of 9 wins and 2 losses from 11 matches, with both losses coming against the tournament winners Australia. However, the 2003 World Cup was the last cricket tournament for Srinath, who retired eight months later due to injury-related issues.

The Indian Squad that finished as the runner up of the 2003 World Cup comprised

 Sourav Ganguly (captain)
 Rahul Dravid (vice-captain and wicketkeeper)
 Ajit Agarkar
 Anil Kumble
 Ashish Nehra
 Dinesh Mongia
 Harbhajan Singh
 Javagal Srinath
 Mohammad Kaif
 Parthiv Patel (reserve wicketkeeper)
 Sachin Tendulkar
 Sanjay Bangar
 Virender Sehwag
 Yuvraj Singh
 Zaheer Khan
India's record: 9−2 (Runner up)
Australia's record: 11−0 (champions)

India at the 2007 World Cup

 NR means No result.

India, this time, had gone to the West Indies with 2 convincing home series wins against the West Indies and Sri Lanka. For the 2007 tournament, India had what was considered a decent World Cup squad, as they had three batsmen who had scored more than 10,000 ODI runs (Sachin Tendulkar, Sourav Ganguly and Rahul Dravid), world class spin bowlers (Harbhajan Singh and Anil Kumble), destructive batsmen (Virender Sehwag, Yuvraj Singh, Robin Uthappa and Mahendra Singh Dhoni), and a decent pace bowling attack led by Zaheer Khan. The format of this tournament was completely different from the 1999 format. Teams were divided into groups of 4, with the top two teams from each group moving on to the Super Eight stage, where each team would play each other in a round-robin format. In the Group stage, India were placed in Group B, pitted against Bangladesh, Sri Lanka and World Cup debutants Bermuda. All of India's Group matches were played at the Queen's Park Oval in Port of Spain, Trinidad and Tobago.

India's World Cup campaign started disastrously, as they unexpectedly lost to minnows Bangladesh in their opening match, leaving them with two must-win matches in their group. All the Indian batsmen, barring Ganguly (66 from 129 balls, 4 fours) and Yuvraj (47 from 58 balls, 3 fours and 1 six), faltered against the pace of Mashrafe Mortaza (4/38) and the left arm spin of Abdur Razzak (3/38) and Mohammad Rafique (3/35) as India were bowled all out for 191. None of the Indian bowlers could make an impact as Bangladesh chased down the target with ease.

India next scored 413/5 against Bermuda, the highest team total in a World Cup game. Sehwag played a brilliant knock (114 from 87 balls, 17 fours and 3 sixes), exposing the amateur Bermudan bowling. Ganguly (89 from 114 balls, 6 fours and 2 sixes), Yuvraj (83 from 46 balls, 3 fours and 7 sixes) and Tendulkar (57 not out from 29 balls, 2 fours and 4 sixes) too contributed, with Ganguly and Sehwag sharing a 202-run partnership for the 2nd wicket, followed by Tendulkar and Yuvraj sharing a 122-run partnership for the 5th wicket. Agarkar and Kumble then contributed with identical bowling figures of 3/38 as Bermuda were bowled all out for 156 in the 44th over, India winning the lopsided game by 257 runs. But they still needed to beat Sri Lanka in their last group match in order to enter the Super Eight stage.

The match against Sri Lanka on 23 March 2007 turned out to be a one-sided contest. Chasing 255, the Indian batting crumbled against the Sri Lankan bowling attack with off-spinner Muttiah Muralitharan and pace bowler Chaminda Vaas taking 2/39 and 3/41 respectively, crashing to 185 all out in the 44th over. Only Dravid (60 from 82 balls, 6 fours) and Sehwag (48 from 46 balls, 5 fours and 1 six) made any significant contribution for India. With one victory and two losses, India's hopes of entering the Super Eight stage were now grim and depended on a Bermuda victory over Bangladesh by a heavy margin in the last Group B match. But with Bangladesh beating Bermuda, India crashed out of the World Cup in the first round, the first time since 1992.

There were no positives India could take from the tournament, barring the heavy win against Bermuda. Apart from Sehwag, Ganguly and Yuvraj, who scored 164, 162 and 136 runs respectively, no other Indian batsman could accumulate even 100 runs. Sehwag, with his 114 against Bermuda, was India's only centurion in the tournament. The bowling was even more pathetic, with Zaheer being India's best bowler with 5 wickets.

After the debacle, Kumble retired from ODI cricket, while coach Greg Chappell resigned after reports that none of the senior players, including Tendulkar, were happy with him and his coaching methods. However, Dravid retained the captaincy. There were several attacks on players homes and protests by infuriated fans, especially in Bangalore and Mumbai.

The Indian Squad that took part in the 2007 World Cup comprised

 Rahul Dravid (captain)
 Sachin Tendulkar (vice-captain)
 Ajit Agarkar
 Anil Kumble
 Dinesh Karthik (reserve wicketkeeper)
 Harbhajan Singh
 Irfan Pathan
 Mahendra Singh Dhoni (wicketkeeper)
 Munaf Patel
 Robin Uthappa
 Shanthakumaran Sreesanth
 Sourav Ganguly
 Virender Sehwag
 Yuvraj Singh 
 Zaheer Khan
India's record: 1−2 (Group B, 3rd place)
Australia's record: 11−0 (champions)

India Won at the 2011 World Cup

 T - Tied.

As one of the host nations for the 2011 World Cup, India were expected to perform well in familiar conditions, and were considered pre-tournament favourites by the media and press. Like in 2007, India came into the World Cup on a string of strong performances, with back-to-back series wins against Australia and New Zealand at home, followed by a moderately successful tour of South Africa.

The Indian team were generally considered to be the strongest batting side in the tournament, comprising the openers Virender Sehwag and veteran Sachin Tendulkar, playing in his 6th consecutive World Cup, followed by Gautam Gambhir and Virat Kohli, with Yuvraj Singh, skipper Mahendra Singh Dhoni, Yusuf Pathan and Suresh Raina completing the star-studded batting line-up. While the bowling attack was considered more suspect, three veterans in pacers Zaheer Khan and Ashish Nehra and offspinner Harbhajan Singh were joined by Munaf Patel, Piyush Chawla, Ravichandran Ashwin, and Shantakumaran Sreesanth. The 1996 World Cup format was used for the tournament, following widespread criticism, particularly from the BCCI, over the 2007 format. India were placed in Group B in the Group stage alongside co-hosts Bangladesh, South Africa, England, the West Indies and associates Holland and Ireland.

India's 2011 World Cup campaign started with an 87-run win against Bangladesh at Dhaka. With centuries from Sehwag (175 from 140 balls, 14 fours, 5 sixes) and Kohli (100 not out from 83 balls, 8 fours, 2 sixes) India scored 4/370. Fast bowler Munaf (4-48) took 4 wickets during the Bangladesh reply, including that of opener Tamim Iqbal (70 from 86 balls, 3 fours, 1 six) as Bangladesh scored 9/283 in 50 overs to fall short.

India next played England at Bangalore, which was a thriller. On a batting-friendly track at the M. Chinnaswamy Stadium, India chose to bat first. Tendulkar (120 from 115 balls, 10 fours, 5 sixes) lashed his way through the English attack, ably supported by Gambhir (51 from 61 balls, 5 fours) and Yuvraj (58 from 50 balls, 9 fours). After the 45th over, India were 305/3 and were looking to pass 350 during the batting Powerplay. Instead, English bowler Tim Bresnan (5-48) engineered a collapse with four quick wickets in 16 deliveries, as India slumped to a still-formidable total of 338 all out. England started their run chase by blasting 77 runs off the first 10 overs. Skipper Andrew Strauss (158 from 145 balls, 18 fours, 1 six) decimated the Indian bowling attack with unparalleled ferocity, and was supported by Ian Bell (69 from 71 balls, 4 fours, 1 six). At 2/280 in the 43rd over, England was cruising to an extraordinary victory. However, Zaheer responded by taking the wickets of Strauss, Bell, and Paul Collingwood in 11 deliveries, as England were reduced to 289/6. Tailenders Bresnan, Graeme Swann, and Ajmal Shahzad each hit massive sixes in the final few overs to regain some momentum, and Swann scored 13 runs off the final over to salvage a tie with India (338/8 in 50 overs). It was only the fourth tied match in World Cup history.

In their third group match, India defeated minnows Ireland, again at Bangalore, by 5 wickets. After winning the toss and choosing to field, India's bowling attack proved superior to the Irish batting lineup. Yuvraj (5-31) was the best bowler for India, taking five successive wickets – including the top scorer for Ireland, William Porterfield (75 from 104 balls, 6 fours, 1 six). Ireland was eventually bowled for 207 all out. During their reply, India slumped to 100/4, as the batting lineup struggled to cope with the tight and accurate Irish bowling. Once again however, Yuvraj (50 not out from 75 balls, 3 fours) helped the Indian side with an unbeaten half-century, and guided India to a five-wicket victory. India followed this victory with a win over Holland at New Delhi. After choosing to bat first, Holland was restricted to 189 all out, with Zaheer (3-20) and Yuvraj (2-43) doing most of the damage. Despite Sehwag's blistering start, India's run-chase started out poorly, as they slumped to 4/99. And, once again, it was Yuvraj (51 not out from 73 balls, 7 fours) who guided India to victory in a crucial 5th-wicket stand with Dhoni (19 not out off 40 balls, 2 fours).

India next played South Africa at Nagpur in what was one of the most anticipated matches of the tournament. India started well, riding on the power hitting of Sehwag (73 from 66 balls, 12 fours), as well as brilliant knocks from Tendulkar (111 from 101 balls, 8 fours, 3 sixes) and Gambhir (69 from 75 balls, 7 fours). However, India, from a very strong position of 267/2 in the 40th over, lost their last 8 wickets for just 29 runs in a massive collapse, slumping to 296 all out, with South African fast bowler Dale Steyn ripping through the Indian batting line up, generating figures of 5-50 in his 9.4 overs. Hashim Amla (61 from 72 balls, 5 fours) and Jacques Kallis (69 from 88 balls, 4 fours) top-scored in reply, as South Africa chased down the total with only 3 wickets and 2 deliveries to spare. AB de Villiers (52 from 39 balls, 6 fours, 1 six) scored a quick half-century to keep South Africa ahead of the required run rate. It was India's first and only loss in their World Cup campaign.

India's final group match was against the West Indies at Chennai. India chose to bat first. Yuvraj (113 from 123 balls, 10 fours, 2 sixes) and Kohli (59 from 76 balls, 5 fours) batted well but received little support from the rest of the lineup, as India were all out for 268. With Devon Smith (81 from 97 balls, 7 fours, 1 six) leading the way, the West Indies reached 154/2 in the 30th over before losing their last 8 wickets for 34 runs due to Zaheer's 3-26, allowing India to coast to an 80-run victory. With this victory, India reached the quarterfinals and finished second in Group B.

In the quarterfinals, India faced defending champions Australia at Ahmedabad. Australia won the toss and chose to bat first. Captain Ricky Ponting (104 from 118 balls, 7 fours, 1 six) and wicketkeeper Brad Haddin (53 from 62 balls, 6 fours, 1 six) scored fluently, but Ashwin, Zaheer and Yuvraj took wickets at regular intervals to restrict Australia to 260/6 in 50 overs. Tendulkar (53 from 68 balls, 7 fours) Gambhir (50 from 64 balls, 2 fours) and Yuvraj (57 not out from 65 balls, 8 fours) all scored half-centuries in reply, as India chased down the target with 5 wickets and 14 deliveries to spare. With this win, Australia's title defence ended and India entered the semifinals.

India played arch-rival Pakistan in the semifinals at Mohali. India won the toss and chose to bat first. Despite Sehwag's customary fast start (38 from 25 balls, 9 fours), the Indian batsmen had trouble coping with the Pakistani bowling attack. Pakistani fast bowler Wahab Riaz (5-46) took a 5-wicket haul for Pakistan and Tendulkar (85 from 115 balls, 11 fours) top-scored for India despite being dropped four times in the field. With India slumping at 187/5 in the 37th over, Suresh Raina (36 not out from 39 balls, 3 fours) shored up the tail as India reached 260/9 in 50 overs. All five Indian bowlers (Zaheer, Munaf, Nehra, Harbhajan and Yuvraj) took two wickets in the Pakistani reply, as Pakistan fell behind the run rate and were bowled all out for 231 with 1 delivery remaining. Misbah-ul-Haq (56 from 76 balls, 5 fours, 1 six) top scored for Pakistan, but his slow start allowed the required run-rate to balloon beyond Pakistan's reach. The win ensured that India maintained their all-win record over their arch-rivals in the World Cup and set up a final with Sri Lanka at the Wankhede Stadium in Mumbai on 2 April 2011.

On a batting-friendly pitch, Sri Lanka won the toss and chose to bat first. Zaheer (2-60), using the new ball, bowled three maiden overs and took the wicket of Upul Tharanga to leave Sri Lanka at 31/1 after 10 overs – their lowest 10-over score in the tournament. However, Mahela Jayawardene (103 not out from 88 balls, 13 fours) rebuilt the Sri Lankan innings with a superb century, helped by captain Kumar Sangakkara (48 from 67 balls, 5 fours). Nuwan Kulasekara (32 from 30 balls, 1 four, 1 six) and Thisara Perera (22 from 9 balls, 3 fours, 1 six) plundered 91 runs from the last 10 overs, lifting Sri Lanka to a formidable total of 274/6 after 50 overs.

India's run chase began badly, as Sehwag and Sachin were bowled cheaply by Lasith Malinga (2-42) to leave India at 31/2 at the 7th over. However, Gambhir (97 from 122 balls, 9 fours) rebuilt the Indian innings with an 83-run partnership for the third wicket with Kohli (35 from 49 balls, 4 fours). After Kohli was caught and bowled to leave India at 114/3, Gambhir and Dhoni (91 not out from 79 balls, 8 fours, 2 sixes) scored 109 runs for the fourth wicket, in a vicious attack on the tiring Sri Lankan bowlers. After Gambhir was bowled by Perera, Yuvraj and Dhoni ensured that India would successfully chase Sri Lanka's score, with Dhoni blasting a massive six off the final delivery. India won the match by six wickets. With the win, India secured their second World Cup, the first since 1983. It was also the first time that the World Cup was won by the host nation in their own backyard (Sri Lanka, though co-hosts of the 1996 World Cup, played the final at Lahore in Pakistan). Dhoni was named Man of the Match for his blistering innings of 91.

Apart from the win, there were other achievements for India in the tournament. Tendulkar scored 482 runs, and was the second-highest run scorer in the tournament after Sri Lankan opener Tillakaratne Dilshan, who scored 500 runs. Zaheer took 21 wickets, and was the leading wicket-taker in the World Cup along with Pakistan's Shahid Afridi. Yuvraj, who scored 362 runs and took 15 wickets, was named Man of the Tournament for his all-round performance. Yuvraj's performance in particular was very significant as he played the tournament battling germ cell cancer..

The Indian Squad that won the 2011 World Cup comprised

 Mahendra Singh Dhoni (captain and wicketkeeper)
 Virender Sehwag (vice-captain)
 Ashish Nehra
 Gautam Gambhir
 Harbhajan Singh
 Munaf Patel
 Piyush Chawla
 Ravichandran Ashwin
 Sachin Tendulkar
 Shanthakumaran Sreesanth
 Suresh Raina
 Virat Kohli
 Yusuf Pathan
 Yuvraj Singh
 Zaheer Khan
 India's record: 7-1 and 1 tie (champions)

India at the 2015 World Cup

As the defending champions, India went into the 2015 World Cup co-hosted by Australia and New Zealand with high expectations and were billed pre-tournament favourites. Unlike in 2007 and 2011, this time India went into the World Cup on the back of poor results, with a mediocre Australian tour preceding the event. Despite this, it was expected that India would still do well in the World Cup due to their familiarity with the Australian conditions, having already spent more than 2 months there. The Indian team for the 2015 World Cup comprised only 4 members from the 2011 World Cup-winning squad, which included captain and wicketkeeper Mahendra Singh Dhoni, Virat Kohli, who was now the vice-captain of the side and one of the best batsmen in ODI cricket, Suresh Raina and Ravichandran Ashwin. For the first time since the 1992 World Cup, the Indian World Cup squad was without Sachin Tendulkar, who had retired from all forms of cricket in 2013, while the other stars of the 2011 World Cup such as Virender Sehwag, Yuvraj Singh, Gautam Gambhir, Harbhajan Singh and Zaheer Khan were dropped due to poor form. Despite the absence of these key performers, the Indian World Cup squad was still a strong side, with a power-packed batting lineup comprising Kohli, Dhoni, Raina, destructive openers Rohit Sharma and Shikhar Dhawan and the stylish middle-order bat Ajinkya Rahane, and a strong bowling attack comprising pacers Mohammed Shami, Umesh Yadav, Mohit Sharma and Bhuvneshwar Kumar, supplemented by the spinners Ashwin and all-rounder Ravindra Jadeja. The 1996 World Cup format, which was also used in 2011, was used for the last time in the World Cup, as the 2019 World Cup saw the return of the round-robin format last used in 1992. In the Group stage, India were placed in Group B with arch-rivals Pakistan, South Africa, the West Indies, minnows Zimbabwe and associates Ireland and the UAE.

India's 2015 World Cup campaign began with a highly anticipated match against Pakistan at Adelaide. Batting first, India lost Rohit (15 from 20 balls, 2 fours) early, but a century from Kohli (107 from 126 balls, 8 fours) along with half-centuries from Raina (74 from 56 balls, 5 fours and 3 sixes) and Dhawan (73 from 76 balls, 7 fours and 1 six) looked to steer India to a big total. However, excellent death bowling by the Pakistani bowlers, with fast bowler Sohail Khan (5-55) taking a 5-wicket haul, restricted India to exactly 300/7, with India losing 5 wickets for just 27 runs. Pakistan's reply, however, had little effect. Barring captain Misbah-ul-Haq, who scored 76, the Pakistani batting crumbled against the Indian pace attack, with Shami taking 4/35, and crashed to 224 all out. India won the match by 76 runs, their biggest win against Pakistan in the World Cup by margin of runs, and as a result, once again maintained their all-win record over their arch-rivals in the World Cup. India next played South Africa at Melbourne, which was another highly anticipated match, in front of a packed crowd comprising mostly Indian supporters. Once again India batted first. Though India lost Rohit early for a duck, they recovered from the early setback thanks to a brilliant century from Dhawan (137 from 146 balls, 16 fours and 2 sixes) and a classy half-century from Rahane (79 from 60 balls, 7 fours and 3 sixes). However, the lower middle-order then crumbled due to good death bowling from the South African pace attack, with India losing 5 wickets for just 31 runs to finish their innings at 307/7. In the chase, despite losing the openers Hashim Amla and Quinton de Kock early, South Africa were going steady at 108/3, with Faf du Plessis scoring a half-century. But the Indian bowlers led by Ashwin (3/41) then struck back as the Proteas lost their last 7 wickets for 69 runs to be bowled all out for 177, India winning by 130 runs. It was the first time that India defeated South Africa in the World Cup, having lost to them in 3 previous Cup encounters in 1992, 1999 and 2011 and was the heaviest defeat for South Africa in the Cricket World Cup.

India ended their Australian leg of the Group stage with back-to-back victories against the UAE and the West Indies at Perth. Ashwin once again starred with the ball in the match against the UAE with his 4/25 as the minnows crashed to 102 all out, which was the lowest score ever registered by a team against India in the World Cup, following which an attacking half-century from Rohit (57 not out from 55 balls, 10 fours and 1 six) ensured that India won the match by 9 wickets, a facile victory which was achieved even before the floodlights could be turned on at the WACA Ground. The match against the West Indies was a low-scoring thriller. Bowling first on a typical fast and bouncy Perth wicket, India restricted the West Indies to 182 all out, with Shami taking 3/35. In reply, the Indian top-order were unable to successfully negotiate the West Indian fast bowling attack of Kemar Roach, Jerome Taylor and Andre Russell and were soon struggling at 107/5, before Dhoni (45 not out from 56 balls, 3 fours and 1 six) took India to victory by 4 wickets. The win against the Caribbeans ensured India's passage into the quarterfinals.

India travelled to New Zealand to play their remaining Group matches. Their first match in New Zealand in this World Cup was against Ireland at Hamilton. Batting first on a perfect batting track, the Irish captain William Porterfield and middle-order batsman Niall O'Brien gave a massive scare to India as they scored half-centuries to propel Ireland to a formidable 206/3 in the 39th over, with the probability of them achieving a 300+ score high. However, Shami (3/41) and Ashwin (2/38) then triggered a collapse, with the Irish losing their last 7 wickets for just 53 runs to collapse to 259 all out. In reply, India were untroubled by the Irish bowling, with a blistering century from Dhawan (100 from 85 balls, 11 fours and 5 sixes), his second in the tournament, along with a half-century from Rohit (64 from 66 balls, 3 fours and 3 sixes) reducing the match to a no-contest as India scaled down the required target with 13 overs and 8 wickets to spare. India topped Group B with 1 match remaining due to the win. India's last match in the Group stage was against Zimbabwe at Auckland, a dead rubber since India had already topped Group B and Zimbabwe were no longer in contention for the quarterfinals with just a single win in this World Cup until this match. However, the match proved to be a thriller. Bowling first, the Indian pace attack struck early to leave Zimbabwe tottering at 33/3. But Zimbabwean skipper Brendan Taylor, who was playing his last match for Zimbabwe, scored a belligerent 138, toying with the spinners. With the support of Sean Williams, who scored 50, and then Craig Ervine, Taylor brought Zimbabwe to a solid position of 235/5 in the 42nd over after which he departed. A 300+ score was imminent at the time, but good death bowling from the Indian fast bowlers comprising Yadav (3/43) as well as Shami and Mohit, who both took identical figures of 3/48, saw Zimbabwe lose their last 5 wickets for 52 runs to be bowled all out for 287. India's reply began shakily, with a 2-wicket maiden over from Tinashe Panyangara accounting for both openers Rohit (16 from 21 balls, 2 fours) and Dhawan (4 from 20 balls, 1 four) early in the innings. Due to good bowling and fielding from the Zimbabweans, the defending champions were soon struggling at 92/4 in the 23rd over and an upset win by Zimbabwe seemed likely. But Raina (110 not out from 104 balls, 9 fours and 4 sixes) scored a breathtaking century under pressure. Though he began his innings scratchily, struggling against the short ball, he soon developed confidence and hammered the Zimbabwean bowling with the support of Dhoni (85 not out from 76 balls, 8 fours and 2 sixes), who secured yet another victory in the World Cup for India in his trademark style by hitting a sixer with just 6 runs to win in the 49th over. India finished the Group stage with an all-win record.

India returned to Australia to play the knockout matches. In the quarterfinals, India played Bangladesh at Melbourne, which they won comfortably by 109 runs. India, batting first, scored 302/6, thanks to an attacking century from Rohit (137 from 126 balls, 14 fours and 3 sixes), who dominated the Bangladeshi bowling with support from Raina (65 from 57 balls, 7 fours and 1 six). The duo shared a partnership of 122 runs for the 4th wicket. Then the Indian pacers, led by Yadav (4/31) and Shami (2/37), never allowed the Bangladeshi batsmen to settle down as they were bowled all out for 193. The match became controversial due to an erroneous umpiring decision involving Rohit. During the 40th over, Rohit, who was batting on 90, pulled a full toss bowled by Bangladeshi bowler Rubel Hossain and was caught at square-leg. However, the umpire Aleem Dar thought that the ball was above waist height and declared it a no-ball, meaning that Rohit was not out. Replays showed that the ball was waist height, and therefore a legal delivery. This decision led to an uproar in Bangladesh, with irate Bangladeshi fans burning effigies of Dar in protest. Even the ICC President Mustafa Kamal, who hails from Bangladesh, and the Prime Minister of Bangladesh Sheikh Hasina opposed the controversial decision. Nevertheless, this incident did not remove the shine from India's clinical victory, which brought them to the semifinals, where they played co-hosts Australia at Sydney. India lost the toss and were made to bowl first on a perfect batting pitch. Australia recovered from the early loss of opener David Warner due to a brilliant century from vice-captain Steve Smith. Supported by a half-century from opener Aaron Finch, the duo put on 182 runs for the 2nd wicket. However, after that the Australian innings wobbled due to good bowling from Yadav (4/72), who achieved a second consecutive 4-wicket haul and provided the important breakthroughs, but due to a late blitz by fast bowler Mitchell Johnson, who scored 27 not out from just 14 balls, the Australians finished their innings at 328/7. A score of 329, though a huge one, was considered gettable taking into account the strength of the Indian batting lineup. The Indians started the chase well with an opening stand of 76 between Rohit (34 from 48 balls, 1 four and 2 sixes) and Dhawan (45 from 41 balls, 6 fours and 1 six). But following the dismissal of Dhawan, the rest of the Indian batsmen succumbed to a combined effort from the Australian pace attack. A slow 70 run stand between Rahane (44 from 68 balls, 2 fours) and Dhoni (65 from 65 balls, 3 fours and 2 sixes) for the 5th wicket only delayed the inevitable as India crashed to 233 all out in the 47th over, losing the match by 95 runs and ending their title defence. It was the second time since 1987 that India failed to defend their World Cup title.

Although India could not successfully defend their World Cup title, several positives emerged from the tournament from an Indian point of view. For the first time ever in a Cricket World Cup, India finished the Group stage unbeaten, with their only loss in the tournament coming against the eventual champions Australia in the semifinal. They achieved 11 consecutive World Cup match victories starting from 2011 during the tournament, which is just below the Cup record of 25 wins in a row, held by Australia. Barring the semifinal, the Indian team bowled out the opposition in every match, a remarkable feat for a bowling attack traditionally considered to be weaker than the batting. With 412 runs from 8 matches including 2 centuries, opener Dhawan was the fifth highest run scorer of the tournament, while the fast bowlers Yadav and Shami bagged the third and fourth spots respectively among the tournament's leading bowlers with 18 and 17 wickets respectively. Skipper and wicketkeeper Dhoni effected 15 dismissals in the Cup, coming second among the leading wicketkeepers in the tournament.

The Indian Squad that made the semifinals of the 2015 World Cup comprised
 Mahendra Singh Dhoni (captain and wicketkeeper)
 Virat Kohli (vice-captain)
 Ajinkya Rahane
 Ambati Rayudu (reserve wicketkeeper)
 Axar Patel
 Bhuvneshwar Kumar
 Mohammed Shami
 Mohit Sharma
 Ravichandran Ashwin
 Ravindra Jadeja
 Rohit Sharma
 Shikhar Dhawan
 Stuart Binny
 Suresh Raina
 Umesh Yadav
India's record: 7-1 (semifinalists)
Australia's record: 7-1 and 1 no result (champions)

India at the 2019 World Cup

 ABN - Match Abandoned 
India were considered one of the favourites to win the 2019 Cricket World Cup hosted in England and Wales. Their record prior to the tournament had been excellent, with highly successful tours of Australia and New Zealand, which was followed by a narrow 2-3 loss in an ODI series at home against Australia. The team for this World Cup was considered to be a strong one, with a powerful batting line comprising captain Virat Kohli, openers Rohit Sharma and K. L. Rahul and veteran wicketkeeper-batsman Mahendra Singh Dhoni, a fast bowling line-up comprising Jasprit Bumrah, Mohammed Shami and Bhuvneshwar Kumar hailed by experts as the best fast-bowling unit India has ever produced, two brilliant wrist spinners including Yuzvendra Chahal and slow left-arm wrist-spin bowler Kuldeep Yadav and quality all-rounders in Hardik Pandya, Kedar Jadhav and Ravindra Jadeja. The only weakness in the side was the number four batsman slot, with Vijay Shankar controversially selected in place of the regular two-down batsman Ambati Rayudu. The round-robin format last used in the 1992 World Cup was used for this tournament, with India playing all the other nine participating teams once.

India began their campaign with a win against South Africa at Southampton. Batting first, the South Africans struggled against the pace of Bumrah (10-1-35-2), who accounted for both openers Hashim Amla and Quinton de Kock, as well as Chahal's leg spin (10-0-51-4) and were 80/4 at one stage, however an eighth-wicket partnership of 76 runs between Chris Morris and Kagiso Rabada ensured that the Proteas finished their innings with a score of 227/9. India chased down the target with ease for the loss of just 4 wickets due to Rohit's century (122 off 144 balls, 13 fours, 2 sixes), ably supported by Rahul (26 off 42 balls, 2 fours) and Dhoni (34 off 46 balls, 2 fours). India next played Australia at The Oval, London, which also turned out to be another one-sided game in favour of India. India, batting first after winning the toss, scored 352/5, with Dhawan cracking a brilliant century (117 off 109 balls, 16 fours) with support from Rohit (57 off 70 balls, 3 fours, 1 six) and Kohli (82 off 77 balls, 4 fours, 1 six), all of whom made a mockery of the Australian bowling attack. There were also late cameos from Pandya (48 off 27 balls, 4 fours, 3 sixes) and Dhoni (27 off 14 balls, 3 fours, 1 six). In response, Australia put up a strong fight, with good contributions from David Warner, Steve Smith and wicketkeeper Alex Carey, who scored 56, 69 and 55 respectively, but India's total was beyond their reach as they folded for 316 all out, India thus winning by 36 runs.  Unfortunately for India, Dhawan fractured his thumb during his century knock, ruling him out for the rest of the tournament. He was replaced by wicketkeeper-batsman Rishabh Pant. India's third match against New Zealand at Trent Bridge, Nottingham, was abandoned without a ball being bowled due to rain.

The much-awaited India vs Pakistan clash took place at Old Trafford, Manchester on 16 June. However, this match turned out to be another no-contest in favour of India. India were made to bat first in a match which was affected by rain. Once Pakistan missed the chance to get Rohit run out in the seventh over, the game was over for Pakistan as Rohit went on to make a brilliant century (140 off 113 balls, 14 fours, 3 sixes), ably supported by Rahul (57 off 78 balls, 3 fours, 2 sixes) and Kohli (77 off 65 balls, 7 fours), however a good death-bowling performance from Mohammad Amir, who took 3/47, restricted India to 336/5 when at one stage, they were cruising towards a post-350 score. Pakistan's reply, however, had little effect. Barring a 104-run second-wicket stand between Babar Azam and Fakhar Zaman, the rest of the Pakistan batting crumbled against India's bowling attack, with a combined bowling effort from Pandya (8-0-44-2), who took the wickets of veterans Mohammad Hafeez and Shoaib Malik in consecutive deliveries, Vijay Shankar (5.2-0-22-2) and Kuldeep (9-1-32-2) leaving Pakistan at 166/6 in the 35th over before the rain began to fall. After the rain, Pakistan's target was reduced to 302 which had to be scored within an impossible 5 overs by the Duckworth–Lewis–Stern method, thus handing India yet another win against their arch-rivals and maintaining their all-win record against them in the World Cup. Pakistan managed to finish their innings at 212/6. India won the match by 89 runs (D/L). Unfortunately for India, Bhuvneshwar sustained a hamstring niggle during the match while bowling, ruling him out until the match against Bangladesh.

India then played the teams who had qualified for the World Cup through the qualifying tournament, Afghanistan and the West Indies, at Southampton and Old Trafford respectively. The match against Afghanistan was a thriller which India managed to win by 11 runs. On a slow pitch, barring Kohli (67 off 63 balls, 5 fours) and Jadhav (52 off 68 balls, 3 fours and 1 six), the rest of the Indian batsmen struggled to make runs against the Afghan bowling attack, with Afghan's spin attack of Rashid Khan, Mujeeb Ur Rahman and Mohammad Nabi, as well as the medium-pace of captain Gulbadin Naib, never allowing the Indian batsmen to settle down. India limped its way to 224/8 in their 50 overs, which was their lowest total batting first and completing their 50 overs since 2010. In the chase, Afghanistan played sedately, with Naib, Rahmat Shah and Nabi making significant contributions, with Nabi going on to score 52 off 55 balls. However a strong bowling performance from India, with contributions from Bumrah (10-1-39-2), Shami (9.5-1-40-4) and Chahal (10-0-36-2) and especially Bumrah and Shami's death-over bowling, kept a check on the Afghan run rate. In the final over, the Afghans needed 16 runs to win the match. Once Shami got Nabi out in the third ball of the final over, the match was over for Afghanistan as he got the wickets of tailenders Aftab Alam and Mujeeb in consecutive deliveries to achieve a hat-trick, which was only the second by an Indian bowler in a World Cup since Chetan Sharma in 1987. Afghanistan was all out for 213 in 49.5 overs. This was also India's 50th win in world cups -third team to achieve the feat after Australia and New Zealand  The match against the Caribbeans on the other hand, witnessed a clinical performance from India, with the team winning by a huge margin of 125 runs. Though India, who batted first, lost Rohit (18 off 23 balls, 1 four and 1 six) early, a good knock from Kohli (72 off 82 balls, 8 fours), supplemented from Dhoni (56 off 61 balls, 3 fours, 2 sixes), which averted a potential middle-order collapse, and also a cameo from Pandya (46 off 38 balls, 5 fours), brought India to a respectable 268/7 in 50 overs. This was followed by yet another strong performance with the ball, with Shami (6.2-0-16-4) taking 4 wickets again, as the Windies were bowled out for just 143 in the 35th over.

India's first loss in the 2019 World Cup came against hosts England in the first of 2 back-to-back matches at Edgbaston, Birmingham, the other match being against Bangladesh. India, who were put to bowl first, bowled poorly for the first time in the tournament, including Shami (10-1-69-5), who was expensive despite taking a 5-wicket haul, as the English batsman, including openers Jason Roy and Jonny Bairstow, who cracked an attacking century, as well as all-rounder Ben Stokes, who scored 79 off just 54 balls, made merry of the Indian bowling attack. England posted 337/7 in their 50 overs. Chasing 338 to win, India lost Rahul early for a duck and from there, they were never able to recover, batting slowly due to a deteriorating pitch. In their first 10 overs, India was only able to score 27 runs for the loss of 1 wicket. Despite Rohit's third century of the tournament (102 off 109 balls, 15 fours) along with Kohli's fifth-consecutive half-century (66 off 76 balls, 7 fours), England's total proved to be beyond India's reach and they ended their innings at 306/5, losing by 31 runs. Dhoni (42 off 31 balls, 4 fours, 1 six) in particular was criticised by former players and fans for his inability to accelerate the scoring rate in the end overs. In contrast, the match against Bangladesh which took place two days later was for the most part, a one-sided affair in favour of India, though Bangladesh put up a strong fight. India started in the strongest possible manner, with Rohit (104 off 92 balls, 7 fours, 5 sixes) scoring his fourth century in the tournament. Along with Rahul (77 off 92 balls, 6 fours, 1 six), the duo put up a partnership of 180 runs for the first wicket, which was the highest partnership by India for the first wicket in the World Cup at the time, beating the previous record of 172 by Rohit and Dhawan against Ireland in 2015. A score of 400 plus seemed likely at one stage, but once Rohit departed, there was a middle-order collapse due to pacer Mustafizur Rahman's 5/59 off his 10 overs. However cameos from Pant (48 off 41 balls, 6 fours and 1 six) and Dhoni (35 off 33 balls, 4 fours) brought India to 314/9 in their 50 overs. In response, Bangladesh fought back, with all-rounder Shakib Al Hasan scoring 66, but a spirited bowling performance from India, courtesy Bumrah (10-1-55-4) and Pandya (10-1-60-3), who also took Shakib's wicket, brought Bangladesh down to 179/6 in the 34th over. Despite a valiant rearguard action from the Bangladesh lower middle-order, with a 66-run partnership for the seventh wicket between Mohammad Saifuddin, who scored a fighting half-century, and Sabbir Rahman, Bangladesh folded for 286, India winning by 28 runs. With this win, India qualified for the semifinals of the 2019 Cricket World Cup.

India ended the round robin stage with an easy 7-wicket win over Sri Lanka at Headingley, Leeds. Batting first, Sri Lanka were 55/4 in the 12th over with Bumrah (10-2-37-3) doing the initial damage, but a century from Angelo Mathews, who was part of a 124-run stand for the fifth wicket with Lahiru Thirimanne, brought Sri Lanka to a respectable 264/7 in 50 overs. India easily chased down the target, with both openers Rohit (103 from 94 balls, 14 fours, 2 sixes) and Rahul (111 from 118 balls, 11 fours, 1 six) putting up a 189-run opening wicket partnership, breaking their own record for India's highest 1st wicket partnership in a Cricket World Cup which was achieved in just their previous match against Bangladesh. Rohit's century was his 5th in the tournament, making him the first ever batsman to hit five centuries in a single Cricket World Cup. With this win, and also South Africa's win over Australia in a match held on the same day, India topped the round robin stage with 7 wins, 1 loss and 1 no-result.

In the semifinals, India played with New Zealand at Old Trafford. The match, spread over two days due to rain, was a thriller. On a slow and seaming wicket in overcast conditions, New Zealand, who were batting first, struggled to accelerate for most of their innings, and only half-centuries from Ross Taylor and Kiwi captain Kane Williamson ensured that the Black Caps reached a score of 239/8 in their 50 overs. For India, Bhuvneshwar (10-1-43-3) was the standout performer among the bowlers. India started their chase very badly, with the top three (Rohit, Rahul and Kohli) going for just 1 run each, courtesy brilliant opening spells from the Kiwi new-ball bowlers Matt Henry and Trent Boult, leaving them in deep trouble at 5/3 in the fourth over. However, a rearguard action from Dhoni (50 from 72 balls, 1 four, 1 six) and Jadeja (77 from 59 balls, 4 fours, 4 sixes), who both shared a partnership of 116 runs for the seventh wicket, which was the highest for India in a Cricket World Cup, brought India from 92/6 to 208/7, giving the Men in Blue a slim chance of winning the match. But once Jadeja and Dhoni, who was playing his final match for India, got out in successive overs, the match was all over for India as they crashed to 221 all out. The Black Caps won the match by 18 runs, and as a result, India crashed out of the 2019 Cricket World Cup, the second consecutive Cricket World Cup in which they went out in the semifinal stage.

Although India did not make the final for the second consecutive World Cup, there were several positives from a statistical point of view. India ended the tournament with 7 wins, 2 losses and 1 no-result, topping the round-robin stage, with both losses coming against eventual finalists England and New Zealand (the no-result coming against the latter opponent as well). With 648 runs and 5 centuries, including 81 boundaries (67 fours and 14 sixes) and involvement in two record first wicket opening stands of 189 and 180 respectively, Rohit Sharma ended the tournament as the highest scorer and with the most centuries. He was also the first batsman to score the most centuries in a single World Cup. Among the bowlers, Jasprit Bumrah was the highest wicket-taker for India with 18 wickets, placing him in joint fourth place alongside England's Mark Wood. He also took the most maidens (9) in the tournament. Also, Mohammed Shami was one of two bowlers, the other being New Zealand's Trent Boult, to take a hat-trick in the tournament, and only the second Indian bowler to do so after Chetan Sharma in 1987.

The 2019 Cricket World Cup would prove to be the last time Mahendra Singh Dhoni played in Indian colours, as he made himself unavailable for team selection following the tournament. Dhoni later announced his retirement from international cricket on 15 August 2020.

The Indian Squad that made the semifinals of the 2019 World Cup comprised

 Virat Kohli (captain)
 Rohit Sharma (vice-captain)
 Bhuvneshwar Kumar
 Dinesh Karthik (reserve wicketkeeper)
 Hardik Pandya
 Jasprit Bumrah
 K. L. Rahul
 Kedar Jadhav
 Kuldeep Yadav
 Mahendra Singh Dhoni (wicketkeeper)
 Mayank Agarwal (replacement for Vijay Shankar)
 Mohammed Shami
 Ravindra Jadeja
 Rishabh Pant (reserve wicketkeeper, replacement for Shikhar Dhawan)
 Shikhar Dhawan 
 Vijay Shankar
 Yuzvendra Chahal
 India's record: 7-2 and 1 washout (semifinalists)
 England's record: 7-3 and 1 tie (champions)

Statistics

Highest innings totals

Lowest completed innings

Best innings figures

Highest partnerships

Highest partnership for each wicket

Most runs

Most wickets

References

External links

India in international cricket
History of the Cricket World Cup
Indian cricket lists